HNLMS Limburg (D814) was a destroyer of the . The ship was in service with the Royal Netherlands Navy from 1956 to 1980. The destroyer was named after the Dutch province of Limburg and was the first ship with this name. In 1980 the ship was taken out of service and sold to Peru where it was  renamed Capitan Quiñones. The ship's radio call sign was "PATM".

Dutch service history
HNLMS Limburg was one of eight s and was built at the KM de Schelde in Vlissingen. The keel laying took place on 28 November 1953 and the launching on 5 September 1955. The ship was put into service on 31 October 1956.

Across the Channel in the United Kingdom, the appointment of Commander-in-Chief, The Nore lapsed on 31 March 1961. Seven days before, a closing ceremony took place, on 24 March 1961. At the ceremony, the station's Queen's Colour was formally laid up in the presence of members of the Admiralty Board, several former Commanders-in-Chief, other civilian and military figures, "..and the Commander-in-Chief of the Netherlands Home Station flying his flag in the new Dutch destroyer Limburg who had been invited to attend."

In 1962 during the West New Guinea dispute Limburg attacked Indonesian planes during the defense of Netherlands New Guinea.

On 1 February 1980 the vessel was decommissioned and sold to the Peruvian Navy.

Peruvian service history

The ship was put into service on 27 June 1980 where the ship was renamed Capitan Quiñones and decommissioned in 1991.

Notes

Friesland-class destroyers
1955 ships
Ships built in Vlissingen
Destroyers of the Cold War